Karsakpay (Qarsaqpaı), is a town in the Ulytau District, Karaganda Region, Kazakhstan. Population:

Geography

The town lies on the southern side of a dam.

Climate

Karsakpay has a cold semi-arid climate (Köppen climate classification BSk), with very warm summers and very cold winters.

Transport
Karsakpay is connected by road to the city of Jezkazgan  to the east. Other roads connect the town of Zhezdi to the north-east, and to the small settlements of Baykonyr, Kiyakty, and Koskol to the west.

See also
 Karsakpay inscription

References

Populated places in Karaganda Region